Carabus jankowskii jankowskii is a subspecies of black coloured beetle from family Carabidae.

References

jankowskii jankowskii
Beetles described in 1883